Blyth's paradise flycatcher (Terpsiphone affinis), also called the oriental paradise flycatcher, is a species of bird in the family Monarchidae.
It is native from southern China to Sumatra and Melanesia. Formerly, it was considered a subspecies of the Asian paradise flycatcher until elevated to species rank by the IOC in 2015.

Subspecies
Ten subspecies are recognized:
 T. a. saturatior - (Salomonsen, 1933): Breeds in the eastern parts of Nepal and northeastern India, in eastern Bangladesh and northern Myanmar; populations occurring in Malaysia migrate northward for breeding. 
 T. a. nicobarica - Oates, 1890: Originally described as a separate species. Found on Nicobar Islands
 T. a. burmae - (Salomonsen, 1933): Found in central Myanmar
 T. a. indochinensis - (Salomonsen, 1933): Found in eastern Myanmar and southern China to Indochina
 T. a. affinis - (Blyth, 1846): Found on Malay Peninsula and Sumatra
 T. a. procera - (Richmond, 1903): Originally described as a separate species. Found on Simeulue (off north-western Sumatra)
 T. a. insularis - Salvadori, 1887: Originally described as a separate species. Found on Nias (off north-western Sumatra)
 T. a. borneensis - (Hartert, 1916): Found on Borneo
 T. a. sumbaensis - Meyer, AB, 1894: Originally described as a separate species. Found on Sumba (southern Lesser Sundas)
The Tenggara paradise flycatcher (T. floris), which is found on Sumbawa, Alor, Lembata and Flores (central Lesser Sundas), was formerly considered a subspecies, but has recently been reclassified as a distinct species.

References

Further reading

Terpsiphone
Birds described in 1846
Taxa named by Edward Blyth